Lahad Khater (1881–1975) was a Lebanese educator, historian, journalist and writer. He was the editor of a Jesuit publication entitled Al Bashir between 1924 and 1947.

Biography
Khater was born in Btater, a village in Aley district, on 1 March 1881. Following his graduation from Al Hikme high school in Beirut he began to work as a teacher. Later he joined Saint Joseph University and Al Farir College. He established a school in his village where he was a teacher.

In 1924 Khater became the editor of Al Bashir which he held until 1947 when the magazine folded. He published many books most of which were about the history of Lebanon. His book Ahd al-mutasarrifîn fi Lubnân 1861–1918 which was published in Beirut in 1967 is about the major political events in Lebanon in the period between 1861 and 1918. He died in 1975.

References

20th-century journalists
20th-century Lebanese writers
1881 births
1975 deaths
Lebanese journalists
Academic staff of Saint Joseph University
Lebanese Maronites
People from Aley District
Lebanese historians
Lebanese educators